A list of all windmills and windmill sites which lie in the current ceremonial county of Surrey.

Locations

A, B

C

D, E

F, G, H

K, L

M, N

O, R

S

T, W

Locations formerly in Surrey

For windmills in Addington, Barnes, Battersea, Bermondsey, Brixton, Camberwell, Camerwell, Clapham, Coulsdon, Croydon, Dulwich, Kew, Lambeth, Newington, Norwood, Richmond, Rotherhithe, Shirley, Southwark, Streatham, Surbiton, Wandsworth and Wimbledon see List of windmills in Greater London.
For windmills in Lowfield Heath see List of windmills in West Sussex.

Notes

Unless otherwise indicated, the reference for all entries is:-

Mills in bold are still standing, known building dates are indicated in bold. Text in italics denotes indicates that the information is not confirmed, but is likely to be the case stated.

Maps

The maps quoted by date are:-

1594 – John Norden
1604 – Charles Whitewell
1610 - John Speed
1635 – Moses Glover
1658 - William Faithorne
1719 - Dr Harris
1729 – John Sennex
1733 – John Seller
1746 – John Rocque
1750 - Bowen
1753 – Emanuel Bowen
1762 – John Rocque
1777 – Andrews and Dury
1789 – Lindley and Crosley
1800 – Laurie and Whittle
1816- Ordnance Survey
1820 – Ordnance Survey
1823 - Bryant
1833 – Bryant and/or Greenwood
1850 – C Knight
1863 – Ordnance Survey
1871 - Ordnance Survey

References

Sources

 
Surrey
Windmills